UTC Portsmouth is a university technical college which opened in September 2017 in Portsmouth, England.

UTC Portsmouth specialises in teaching STEM subjects with a particular focus on Mechanical and Electrical Engineering disciplines. The UTC's sponsors include the Royal Navy, BAE Systems, QinetiQ, the University of Portsmouth and Portsmouth City Council.

The UTC's building, in the grounds of Trafalgar School, was constructed by BAM Construction over a twelve-month period and was completed during August 2017. The consultant design team were:
 Architect – Stride Treglown
 Structural and Civil Engineer – Ridge and Partners
 Mechanical and Electrical Engineers – Hydrock
 Landscape Architect – Stride Treglown

References

External links 
 

Portsmouth
Secondary schools in Portsmouth
Educational institutions established in 2017
2017 establishments in England